The 2013 TIM Supercoppa Italiana Final was the 26th edition of the Supercoppa, an annual football match contested by the winners of the previous season's Serie A and Coppa Italia competitions. Defending champions Juventus, also reigning Serie A champions, won the game 4–0 against Coppa Italia holders Lazio. It was Juventus' second consecutive Supercoppa win, and sixth overall, matching Milan's record.

Details

References 

Supercoppa Italiana
Supercoppa 2013
Supercoppa 2013
2